The Newcastle-under-Lyme Canal was a 3 mile 6 furlongs (6 km) level canal from the Trent & Mersey Canal at Stoke-on-Trent to Newcastle-under-Lyme.  It was completed in 1800.
The canal has been disused since 1935.

Historical timeline
1795 - an Act of Parliament in granted permission for the making and maintaining a navigable Canal, from and out of the Navigation from the Trent to the Mersey, at or near Stoke-upon-Trent, in the county of Stafford, to the town of Newcastle-under-Lyme, in the said county.

1796 - a rival canal, Sir Nigel Gresley's Canal opened and had secured exclusive rights to supply Newcastle with coal for 21 years on condition that the price was no higher than 25 pence per ton. The agreement forbade the Newcastle-under-Lyme Canal from carrying any coal other than for use in the pottery trade.

1800 - the canal opened and because Gresley had exclusive rights to coal carrying, limestone became the main cargo on the Newcastle Under Lyme Canal.

1863 - the canal was sold to the North Staffordshire Railway. By this time the railway company also owned the Trent & Mersey Canal which the Newcastle Canal very much depended on. The canal's shareholders did very well out of the deal considering the route had only ever paid out occasional and very low dividends during their ownership. The railway company did not close down the Newcastle Canal and it continued in commercial use.

1921 - the northernmost part of the canal was closed.

1935 - the remaining part of the Newcastle Canal was closed and the whole waterway was abandoned.

present - after its closure the canal was filled in, and today little evidence of the canal remains.

The route
The terminus of the Newcastle Canal was close to Brook Lane at an elevation of around 110m.  A pub named the Boat & Horses still stands near the former basin though the basin itself was converted into railway sidings many years ago during the construction of the Stoke-on-Trent to Newcastle-under-Lyme train line, which began construction on 26 June 1846.  Although still extant in 1971 these sidings have also now been removed.

The canal headed southeast on the west side of London Road (A34).  Where Occupation Street leaves London Road is the spot that would have been the bottom of a planned inclined plane providing a link to the Newcastle-under-Lyme Junction Canal, and then on to Sir Nigel Gresley's Canal; however this inclined plane was never built and so the two canals never connected.  Near here is the newly developed Lyme Valley Parkway, a recreational park built on a former rubbish tip. To the west of the canal line there is a small stream, Lyme Brook.

A little further south there is a small Jewish synagogue/cemetery and a bowling green.  The canal ran behind these into a cutting surrounded by a small wood.  Past here it emerges by the side of the busy A34 opposite the General Hospital and the newly built University Hospital of North Staffordshire.  Surprisingly this section has survived and today it is the only part of any of the canal that holds water.

A couple of minor roads crossed the canal as it ran south close to the A34.  At Oak Hill the canal curved southwest for a hundred yards or so and then curved back round to head east under the A34. The crossing point on the main road was about halfway between the B5041 (heading north east towards Stoke) and the A34/A500 Hanford roundabout.  At Oak Hill the dry bed of the canal can be found behind The Cottage pub.

Roughly following the B5041, the canal continued east until it reached the now minor road but former A5006 which runs north east from the afore mentioned roundabout. When the canal reached the old A5006 it turned again and headed northeast into Boothen. The route pulled away from the A5006 until it came close to the B5041.  In Boothen the line of the canal can still be seen where it is grassed over alongside this London Road.
Just before the B5041 and the former canal line met the A52 in Stoke the canal disappeared into a relatively short tunnel.

On the far side of the tunnel is Spode factory and museum, shortly after this the Newcastle Canal ran into the Trent & Mersey Canal near Glebe Street.  Until the early 1970s there was a 100 yard stretch of navigable Newcastle-under-Lyme Canal here which was used as moorings for Stoke Boat Club, this stretch was wiped out when the A500 by-pass was built. The one remaining item of the canal which can still be seen in Stoke is the site of a bridge in Corporation Street where both parapets have survived near the junction with London Road (B5041).

See also

Canals of Great Britain
History of the British canal system
Trent and Mersey Canal

Bibliography
"Historical Account of the Navigable Rivers, Canals, and Railways, of Great Britain" by John Priestley

References

External links
Roots and Routes a detailed timeline of Newcastle-under-Lyme's Canals.
Waterways of Stoke-on-Trent a detailed description of the route with pictures.
Online version of Priestley's Navigable Rivers and Canals

Newcastle-under-Lyme